Attaullah Khan Niazi, SI PP (Urdu,) (born 19 August 1951), known professionally as Attaullah Khan Esakhelvi also known as Lala (meaning "elder brother" in Pashto and Punjabi), is a Pakistani musician from Isakhel, Mianwali, Punjab. 

In 2011, he appeared in Coke Studio (season 4) and sang 3 songs Ni Oothaan Waale,  and Pyaar Naal.

In September 2017, he appeared again in Coke Studio (season 10)  and sang Sab Maya Hai with his traditional band.

Early life
Esakhelvi was born on 19 August 1951 in Esa Kheil, Mianwali, Punjab Province, Pakistan as Attaullah Khan Niazi. Attaullah developed an interest in music as a child, but music was strictly forbidden in his home. Despite the restriction on music in his home, Attaullah secretly sought to learn more about music. His school teacher taught him Mohammed Rafi and Mukesh songs and told him never to stop singing. Attaullah tried to explain his passion for music to his parents and convince them to let him sing, but they forbade him to continue singing. Disillusioned, Attaullah left home when he was 18 years old. He traveled extensively within Pakistan and supported himself by working from Mianwali. He is most popular in rural areas of Pakistan and many other countries in the world.

Musical career
Esakhelvi continued his training after leaving his parents' home and often recorded himself on cassette tapes that he later distributed.

In 1972, Esakhelvi was invited to perform on Radio Pakistan, Bahawalpur. That same year, he performed in a concert in Mianwali, Punjab, Pakistan.  Esakhelvi performed on the television show Neelam Ghar in 1973.

He was invited by a company in Faisalabad to record folk songs in their studio, and recorded four albums in one recording session. The albums were released at the end of 1977 and became national bestsellers.

In 1980, Esakhelvi performed in the United Kingdom for the first time. It was also his first concert abroad. His albums were eventually released in UK under various labels, including Hi-tech, OSA and Moviebox.

He has performed Na`at and Kalaam of famous Sufi poets, such as Mian Muhammad Bakhsh's Saiful Maluk and Bulleh Shah's Keey Bay Dardan Sang Yaree. He also sang song of S M Sadiq a famous lyricist who has written songs in  Punjabi, Urdu and Hindi languages. Attaullah Khan visited India during 2014. The Times of India wrote: "A Sufi concert, Ibaadat, organized in association with Navbharat Times, was recently held at Purana Quila in the capital. Pakistani folk singer Attaullah Khan performed for the first time in Delhi at this event. Khan sang his Achha Sila Diya Tune Mere Pyaar Ka, and other Pakistani Sufi hits for the audience. The concert was organized by the AAS group, an NGO which works to spread awareness about cervical cancer among women and ways to prevent it, and this concert was organized to spread that message."

Personal life
Attaullah Khan is from Mianwali District and his hometown is Esakhel. He received his early education from Esakhel. He is traditionally considered a Saraiki which is a dialect of Punjabi language singer.

Attaullah relocated to Lahore after becoming a professional musician performing in Saraiki, Urdu and English. He has been married four times and has four children. His daughter Laraib Atta is a professional VFX artist who has worked for several Hollywood films. His son Sanwal Esakhelvi is also pursuing a career in music,

Legacy
He is considered a folk icon in Pakistan and is widely considered one of the most popular folk singers in Pakistan. The constant companion of Pakistani truck drivers is the lilting tunes of Attaullah Khan Esakhelvi. This Mianwali-born vocalist with his swashbuckler moustache, kameez shalwar and shawl on one shoulder became the poster boy for traditional Pakistani music.

Singing in Saraiki, that dominates western and southern Punjab, his searing impassioned songs caught on like wildfire almost from the moment he recorded his first session for Radio Pakistan, Bahawalpur in the mid 1970s. For years, Esakhelvi reigned supreme and unchallenged, in a universe that existed parallel to the cultured music salons of the elite.

He has recorded more than 50,000 songs in seven languages. He has received a lifetime achievement award from Queen Elizabeth II of Great Britain, and had his name entered in the Guinness Book of World Records in 1994 for the highest number of audio albums released.

Awards
 The Government of Pakistan awarded him the Pride of Performance Award in 1991. 
 Sitara e Imtiaz (Star of Excellence) on 23 March 2019 by the President of Pakistan.

Selected popular songs

Musicians
Attaullah has his own band which travels with him. Members of the band include:
 Salamat Ali Khan (tabla)
 Javed Ali (dholak)
 Babar (flute)
 Sabir Ali (harmonium)

The musicians in Attaullah's band have performed with him since the 1970s, in Pakistan, United States of America, Japan, Canada, United Kingdom, France, Spain, Germany, India, Italy, Australia, Oman, New Zealand, Hong Kong and UAE.

References

External links

1951 births
Living people
Pakistani folk singers
Pakistani male singers
People from Mianwali District
Recipients of the Pride of Performance
Pashtun people
Recipients of Sitara-i-Imtiaz
Coke Studio (Pakistani TV program)